Current Polish coins and banknotes issued by the National Bank of Poland.

Coins
Although some of the coins were minted as early as 1990, they were not released until January 1, 1995, when the złoty was redenominated after hyperinflation was harnessed.  There are 100 grosz (gr) to one złoty (zł).

Mintage

Special issue 5zł coins
These special issue coins have value and are intended for general circulation.

Banknotes

Commemorative banknotes

See also

 Poland and the euro
 Polish złoty
 Commemorative coins of Poland

References 

Currencies of Poland
Lists of coins